The Globe Soccer Awards popularly known as 'Dubai D'or' are football awards organised by the European Club Association (ECA) in conjunction with the European Association of Player's Agents (EFAA) and delivered by the organisation Globe Soccer. The award ceremony is held in the city of Dubai in the United Arab Emirates, which brings together the main representatives of the world of football (FIFA, ECA, UEFA), the League of the United Arab Emirates, major world clubs and their managers, encouraging an exchange of views on the world of football as a major goal, alongside transfer-related issues and the football market.

The first meeting was held in 2009, but the first prizes were not awarded until 2010, with three being awarded. In 2011 the number of awards and categories was increased, reaching up to six. The 2012 edition delivered a larger number, reaching ten football-related categories.

Winners

2010
 In December 2010, during the closing gala, the Audi Football Night, the winners of the Globe Soccer Awards were announced:
 Best Agent of the Year –  Jorge Mendes
 Best Director of the Year –  Miguel Ángel Gil Marín (Atlético Madrid)
 Special Career Award –  Adriano Galliani (Milan)

2011
 In December 2011, six awards were awarded in Dubai:
 Best Player of the Year –  Cristiano Ronaldo (Real Madrid)
 Greatest media attraction in football –  Cristiano Ronaldo (Real Madrid)
 Best Club of the Year –  Barcelona
 Player's career –  Alessandro Del Piero (Juventus)
 Best Agent of the Year –  Jorge Mendes
 Director's Career –  Pinto da Costa (Porto)

2012
 In December 2012, 10 awards were awarded in Dubai:
 Best Club of the Year –  Atlético Madrid
 Best Player of the Year –  Radamel Falcao (Atlético Madrid)
 Player's career –  Eric Abidal (Barcelona)
 Best player of the Century –  Diego Maradona
 Best Agent of the Year –  Jorge Mendes
 Agent's career –  Rob Jansen
 Best coach of the year –  José Mourinho (Real Madrid)
 Best Goal Scorer of the UAE –  Hassan Mohamed (Dubai CSC)
 Greatest media attraction in football –  José Mourinho (Real Madrid)
 Special award –  Michel Platini

2013
 In December 2013, 11 awards were awarded in Dubai:
 Best Player of the Year –   Franck Ribery (Bayern Munich)
 Best Agent of the Year  –  Jorge Mendes
 Agent Career Award  –  Giovanni Branchini
 Player Career Award  –  Deco
 Best Coach of the Year  –  Antonio Conte (Juventus)
 Coach Career Award  –  Pep Guardiola (Bayern Munich)
 Best Media Attraction in Football  –  Pep Guardiola (Bayern Munich)
 Best Club of the Year  –  Bayern Munich
 Record Breaking Player Award  –  Xavi (Barcelona)
 Best Coach in the GCC  –  Mahdi Ali (United Arab Emirates)

2014
 In December 2014, 13 awards were awarded in Dubai:
 Best Player of The Year  –  Cristiano Ronaldo (Real Madrid)
 Marca Fans' Favourite Player –  Cristiano Ronaldo (Real Madrid)
 Best Agent of the Year  –  Jorge Mendes
 Player Career Award  –  Filippo Inzaghi
 Best Coach of the Year  –  Carlo Ancelotti (Real Madrid)
 Best Media Attraction in Football  –  Carlo Ancelotti (Real Madrid)
 Best Club of the Year  –  Real Madrid
 Best President of the Year  –  Florentino Pérez (Real Madrid)
 Best Revelation Player of the Year  –  James Rodríguez (Real Madrid)
 Best Referee of the Year  –  Nicola Rizzoli
 Best Media Executive  –  Riccardo Silva
 Best Arab Player of The Year  –  Medhi Benatia
 Special Award –  Atlético Madrid (Special Award)

2015
 In December 2015, 12 awards were awarded in Dubai:
 Best Player of The Year –  Lionel Messi (FC Barcelona)
 Best Agent of the Year  –  Jorge Mendes
 First Player Career Award  –  Andrea Pirlo
 Second Player Career Award  –  Frank Lampard
 Best Coach of the Year  –  Marc Wilmots (Belgium)
 Best Media Attraction in Football  –  Barcelona
 Best Media Executive  –  Javier Bordas
 Best Club of the Year  –  Barcelona
 Best President of the Year  –  Josep Maria Bartomeu (Barcelona)
 Best Referee of the Year  –  Ravshan Irmatov
 Best Club Academy  –  Benfica
 Best Player in the GCC  –  Yasser Al-Shahrani (Al-Hilal)

2016
 In December 2016, 15 awards were awarded in Dubai:
 Best Player of The Year  –  Cristiano Ronaldo (Real Madrid)
 Goodwill Award –  Cristiano Ronaldo
 Best Club of the Year  –  Real Madrid
 Best President of the Year  –  Florentino Pérez (Real Madrid)
 Best Coach of the Year  –  Fernando Santos (Portugal)
 Best Referee of the Year  –  Mark Clattenburg
 Best Player in the GCC  –  Omar Abdulrahman (Al Ain)
 Best Club in the GCC  –  Al-Hilal FC
 Best Arab Player of The Year  –  Mohamed Salah (A.S. Roma)
 Best Chinese Player of The Year  –  Zheng Zhi (Guangzhou Evergrande)
 Best Agent of the Year  –  Mino Raiola
 Player Career Award –  Javier Zanetti
 Player Career Award –  Samuel Eto'o
 Special Award –  Unai Emery
 Best Sports Media Agency of the Year – MP & Silva

2017
 In December 2017, 14 awards were awarded in Dubai:
 Best Player of the Year  –  Cristiano Ronaldo (Real Madrid)
 Best Club of the Year  –  Real Madrid
 Best Coach of the Year  –  Zinedine Zidane (Real Madrid)
 Best League of the Year –  La Liga
 Best Referee of the Year –  Felix Brych
 Player Career Award –  Francesco Totti
 Player Career Award –   Carles Puyol
 Coach Career Award –  Marcello Lippi
 Best Arab National Team Coach –  Héctor Cúper (Egypt)
 Best Arab National Team –  Saudi Arabia
 Best Agent of the Year  –  Jorge Mendes
 Football Executive of the Year –  Vadim Vasilyev (Monaco)
 The Sport Business Award –  Ferran Soriano
 Master Coach Special Award –  Diego Simeone (Atlético Madrid)

2018
 In January 2019, 13 awards were awarded in Dubai:
 Best Player of the Year –  Cristiano Ronaldo (Real Madrid / Juventus)
 Globe Soccer 433 Fans' Award –  Cristiano Ronaldo (Real Madrid / Juventus)
 Best Club of the Year –  Atlético Madrid
 Best Coach of the Year –  Didier Deschamps (France)
 Best Goalkeeper of the Year –  Alisson Becker (Roma, Liverpool)
 Best Agent of the Year –  Jorge Mendes
 Special Career Award –  Zvonimir Boban
 Player Career Award –  Ronaldo
 Player Career Award –   Blaise Matuidi
 Coach Career Award –  Fabio Capello
 Best Sporting Director of the Year –  Fabio Paratici (Juventus)
 Arab Career Award –  Sami Al-Jaber
 Best Arab Referee of the Year –  Mohammed Abdullah

2019
 In December 2019, 16 awards were awarded in Dubai:
 Best Men's Player of the Year –  Cristiano Ronaldo (Juventus)
 Best Revelation Player –  João Félix (Benfica, Atlético Madrid)
 Best Women's Player of the Year –  Lucy Bronze (Lyon)
 Best Referee of the Year –  Stéphanie Frappart
 Player Career Award –  Miralem Pjanić (Juventus)
 Best Partnership of the Year Award by Sport Business –  Manchester City and  SAP
 Best Agent of the Year –  Jorge Mendes
 Player Career Award –  Ryan Giggs
 Best Academy of the Year –   Ajax and  Benfica
 Best Young Arab Player of the Year –  Achraf Hakimi (Borussia Dortmund)
 Best Arab Club Award –  Al-Hilal
 Best Arab Player Award –  Abderrazak Hamdallah (Al-Nassr)
 Best Club of the Year –  Liverpool
 Best Coach of the Year –  Jürgen Klopp (Liverpool)
 Best Goalkeeper of the Year –  Alisson Becker (Liverpool)
 Best Sporting Director of the Year –  Andrea Berta (Atlético Madrid)

2020
 In December 2020, 10 awards were awarded in Dubai:
 Player of the Century 2001–2020:  Cristiano Ronaldo (Juventus)
 Player of the Year:  Robert Lewandowski (Bayern Munich)
 Player Career Award:  Iker Casillas
 Player Career Award:  Gerard Piqué (Barcelona)
 Coach of the Century 2001–2020:  Pep Guardiola (Manchester City)
 Coach of the Year:  Hansi Flick (Bayern Munich)
 Club of the Century 2001–2020:  Real Madrid
 Club of the Year:  Bayern Munich
 Top Title Winners in the Middle East:  Al Ahly
 Agent of the Century 2001–2020:  Jorge Mendes

2021
 In December 2021, 17 awards were awarded in Dubai:
 Top Goal Scorer of All Time:  Cristiano Ronaldo (Juventus / Manchester United)
 Maradona Award:  Robert Lewandowski (Bayern Munich)
 TikTok Fans' Player of the Year:  Robert Lewandowski (Bayern Munich)
 Coach of the Year:  Roberto Mancini (Italy)
Defender of the Year:  Leonardo Bonucci (Juventus)
Goalkeeper of the Year:  Gianluigi Donnarumma (Milan / PSG)
 Men's player of the Year:  Kylian Mbappé (PSG)
Women's player of the Year:  Alexia Putellas (Barcelona)
 Player Career Award:  Ronaldinho
 Men's club of the Year:  Chelsea
Women's club of the Year:  Barcelona
Best youth academy in Africa:  ZED
 Agent of the Year:  Federico Pastorello
Innovation award:  Serie A
Esports player of the Year:  Msdossary7
Sporting director of the Year:  Txiki Begiristain (Manchester City)
National team of the Year:  Italy

2022
 On 17 November 2022, the following 12 awards were awarded in Dubai:
 Men's Player of the Year:  Karim Benzema (Real Madrid)
 TikTok Fans' Player of the Year:  Mohamed Salah (Liverpool)
 Women's Player of the Year:  Alexia Putellas (Barcelona)
 Best Defender of All Time:  Sergio Ramos
 Executive Career Award:  Adriano Galliani (Monza)
 Coach Career Award:  Unai Emery
 Youth Team of the Year:  Benfica
 Transfer of the Year:  Erling Haaland to Manchester City
 Scout of the Year:  Juni Calafat (Real Madrid)
 Player Career Award:  Wayne Rooney,  Zlatan Ibrahimović and  Romário
 Sporting Director of the Year:  Paolo Maldini &  Frederic Massara (AC Milan)
 President of the Year:  Florentino Pérez (Real Madrid)
 Coach of the Year:  Carlo Ancelotti (Real Madrid)
 Women's Club of the Year:  Olympique Lyonnais
 Men's Club of the Year:  Real Madrid
 Emerging Player of the Year:  Victor Osimhen (Napoli)

Awards of the Century

Player of the 20th century
At the 2012 Globe Soccer Awards ceremony, the organisation decided to award a special award to recognise the best Player of the 20th Century.

 Player of the 20th century:  Diego Armando Maradona (Argentinos Juniors/Boca Juniors/Barcelona/Napoli/Sevilla/Newell's Old Boys/Argentina)

21st Century Awards
Similarly, at the Globe Soccer 2020 Awards ceremony, the organisation decided to simultaneously award a series of special awards known as the 21st Century Awards, which seek to recognise the most important figures in football in the period 2001–2020. The award ceremony was attended by different personalities linked to the world of football, in which highlights the president of FIFA Gianni Infantino who had delivered a speech at the conference.

 Player of the 21st century:  Cristiano Ronaldo (Sporting CP/Manchester United/Real Madrid/Juventus/Al Nassr/Portugal)
 Coach of the 21st Century:  Pep Guardiola (Barcelona/Bayern Munich/Manchester City) 
 Club of the 21st Century:  Real Madrid
 Agent of the 21st Century:  Jorge Mendes

Best Agent of the Year Award 
 2010 –  Jorge Mendes
 2011 –  Jorge Mendes (2)
 2012 –  Jorge Mendes (3)
 2013 –  Jorge Mendes (4)
 2014 –  Jorge Mendes (5)
 2015 –  Jorge Mendes (6)
 2016 –   Mino Raiola 
 2017 –  Jorge Mendes (7)
 2018 –  Jorge Mendes (8)
 2019 –  Jorge Mendes (9)
 2021 –  Federico Pastorello
 2022 –  Jorge Mendes (10)

By agent 
 Jorge Mendes – 10 wins
  Mino Raiola – 1 win
 Federico Pastorello – 1 win

Best Player of the Year Award

By year 
 2011 –  Cristiano Ronaldo (Real Madrid)
 2012 –  Radamel Falcao (Atletico Madrid)
 2013 –  Franck Ribery (Bayern Munich)
 2014 –  Cristiano Ronaldo (Real Madrid) (2)
 2015 –  Lionel Messi (Barcelona)
 2016 –  Cristiano Ronaldo (Real Madrid) (3)
 2017 –  Cristiano Ronaldo (Real Madrid) (4)
 2018 –  Cristiano Ronaldo Juventus) (5)
 2019 –  Cristiano Ronaldo (Juventus) (6)
 2020 –  Robert Lewandowski (Bayern Munich)
 2021 –  Kylian Mbappé (PSG)
 2022 –  Karim Benzema (Real Madrid)

By player 
 Cristiano Ronaldo (Real Madrid / Juventus / Manchester United) – 6 wins
 Radamel Falcao (Atletico Madrid) – 1 win
 Frank Ribery (Bayern Munich) – 1 win
 Lionel Messi (Barcelona) – 1 win
 Robert Lewandowski (Bayern Munich) – 1 win
 Kylian Mbappé (PSG) – 1 win
 Karim Benzema (Real Madrid) – 1 win

Best Coach of the Year Award
 2012 –  José Mourinho (Real Madrid)
 2013 –  Antonio Conte (Juventus)
 2014 –  Carlo Ancelotti (Real Madrid)
 2015 –  Marc Wilmots (Belgium)
 2016 –  Fernando Santos (Portugal)
 2017 –  Zinedine Zidane (Real Madrid)
 2018 –  Didier Deschamps (France)
 2019 –  Jürgen Klopp (Liverpool)
 2020 –  Hansi Flick (Bayern Munich)
 2021 –  Roberto Mancini (Italy)
 2022 –  Carlo Ancelotti (Real Madrid) (2)

Best Club of the Year Award
 2011 –  Barcelona
 2012 –  Atlético Madrid
 2013 –  Bayern Munich
 2014 –  Real Madrid
 2015 –  Barcelona (2)
 2016 –  Real Madrid (2)
 2017 –  Real Madrid (3)
 2018 –  Atlético Madrid (2)
 2019 –  Liverpool 
 2020 –  Bayern Munich (2)
 2021 –  Chelsea
 2022 –  Real Madrid (4)

By team

See also
Ballon d'Or

References

External links
 Globe Soccer Awards

Association football trophies and awards
Awards established in 2010